Adventure Time was a Canadian children's adventure television series which aired on CBC Television in 1967 and 1968.

Scheduling

The 1967 run of the series was broadcast Fridays at 5:00 p.m. (Eastern) from 21 April to 23 June featuring episodes such as "Caught in the Net", "The Dragon of Pendragon Hall", "The Missing Note" and "One Wish Too Many."

The following year's run was aired Wednesday to Friday at 4:30 p.m. from 13 to 28 June 1968 and featured episodes such as "Eagle Rock", "John of the Fair", "Peril for the Guy" and "Riders of the New Forest".

References

External links
 

CBC Television original programming
1967 Canadian television series debuts
1968 Canadian television series endings
1960s Canadian children's television series